Sitochori is a village in the northern part of the Evros regional unit, Greece. It is part of the municipality of Didymoteicho. In 2011 its population was 326. Sitochori is about 20 km northwest of central Didymoteicho, and north of the river Erythropotamos.

Population

History
Before 1913 Sitochori was under Ottoman Turkish control. The name of the village under Turkish control was Казълджикьой. There were 150 Bulgarian (Hane) houses in the village. After a brief period of Bulgarian rule between 1913 and 1919, it became part of Greece. The village changed its name to Skourtochori (Σκουρτοχώρι) in 1923 and then it was renamed to its current name, Sitochori, in 1954.

See also
List of settlements in the Evros regional unit

References

External links
Sitochori on GTP Travel Pages

Didymoteicho
Populated places in Evros (regional unit)